is a member of the Liberal Democratic Party of Japan serving in the House of Representatives, his second time holding the position. He is opposed to nuclear power, a position that is at odds with that of his party.

References

1975 births
Living people
Liberal Democratic Party (Japan) politicians
Members of the House of Representatives (Japan)